Paballo Koza (born 19 March 2002) is a South African actor. Koza began acting at age 5, and later received an Africa Movie Academy Award nomination for Best Young Actor for his starring role in Dora’s Peace.

Career 
Koza started acting at age five by acting in a commercial. Since then, he's been in a number of other commercials and has acted in a variety of television shows and movies. In 2018, Koza uploaded his first video on his YouTube channel.

Filmography

Television

Film

References

General references
(sites not yet used as citations)

 https://www.channel24.co.za/Movies/News/sa-bags-28-nominations-at-the-africa-movie-academy-awards-20170517-2
 https://www.channel24.co.za/Movies/News/doras-peace-takes-audiences-into-the-mean-streets-of-hillbrow-20160621

External links

2002 births
Living people
South African male television actors
South African male film actors
21st-century South African male actors